Howrah Ramkrishnapur High School is a Bengali medium Secondary School for boys situated near Mallick Fatak Bus Stop, Howrah district, West Bengal, India. The school is not so far from the Howrah Maidan and Ramkrishnapur Ghat. Most of the students in this school are from local places. The school is situated in Howrah Madhya (Vidhan Sabha constituency) as well as Howrah (Lok Sabha constituency). This area is under Howrah Municipal Corporation (HMC/28). It has 106 students and 2 teachers.

Affiliation
 West Bengal Board of Secondary Education for Secondary level.
 The West Bengal Council of Rabindra Open Schooling  for both Secondary & Higher Secondary levels.
 West Bengal State Council of Vocational Education and Training for Vocational courses.

See also 
 Howrah Sangha Adarsha Balika Vidyalaya
Education in India
List of schools in India
Education in West Bengal

References

External links

Boys' schools in India
High schools and secondary schools in West Bengal
Schools in Howrah district
Education in Howrah
Educational institutions established in 1862
1862 establishments in India